All Saints Episcopal School is a small private Christian school in Tyler, Texas. It is a college preparatory school from Pre-kindergarten through 12th grade.

All Saints Episcopal School was founded in 1976. Its first year had 118 students and 11 faculty. In 1982, Mr. W. W. Wagley donated 20 acres for a new school site which is the school's current campus. In 1983, the new building was completed for the 1983 - 1984 school year, and 326 students were enrolled in preschool through 8th grade.

References

External links 
 

Christian schools in Texas
Schools in Smith County, Texas
High schools in Tyler, Texas
Educational institutions established in 1976
Private K-12 schools in Texas
1976 establishments in Texas